KHRB-LP (92.3 FM) is a radio station broadcasting a contemporary Christian music format. Licensed to Harrisburg, Oregon, United States, the station is currently owned by Rock Solid Ministries.

References

External links
 

Contemporary Christian radio stations in the United States
Linn County, Oregon
HRB-LP
Radio stations established in 2004
2004 establishments in Oregon
HRB-LP